Blondeau River may refer to:

Blondeau River (Chibougamau Lake), Quebec, Canada
Blondeau River (Fraser River), Quebec, Canada